Ajax Wanderers R.U.F.C. are a rugby union club that is based in Ajax, Ontario, Canada.  The Senior men's team currently runs two teams with the top XV squad competing in the Ontario Marshall Provincial division. the 2012 season saw the men win both the 1st division and second division granting them promotion to the Ontario Marshall Premier division for the 2013 season.
The Wanderers also run programme for all age groups and genders. The Following Programs are running for the 2014 season;
 Co-ed flag mini rugby under 8, under 10 and under 12 programs.
 2 u14 boys teams.
 2 u16 boys teams.
 2 u18 boys teams.
 1 u18 girls team.
 2 Senior men's teams

History
The Ajax Wanderers Rugby Club can lay claim to being the founding club for rugby in post-war Ontario. The club was formed by a group of English immigrants who missed their favorite sport from back home in 1949. The early years saw games against the University of Toronto and McGill University. The Toronto Nomads, Aurora Barbarians, Markham Irish Canadians and to a lesser extent the Brantford Harlequins all owe their existence to those early Wanderers. Once a league was in place Wanderers became immediately successful winning several provincial championships in the late 1950s. The club also began a tradition of touring that continues to this day. Going on tour and hosting teams are one of the finest traditions in rugby and the sport provides an opportunity like no other for players to travel the world as a team or as individuals. Over the years Wanderers have toured extensively within Canada, the United States, Great Britain and even an occasional trip to the continent. The club has also hosted teams from all over the world. Developing players to play on the provincial, national and international stage has always been a priority and the Wanderers have provided players to the Canadian national team almost from its beginnings with John Ackerly representing his country in 1971 and that tradition has continued through the years with the likes of Karl Svoboda playing in the first three World Cups, and Dave Moonlight who is the leading points and try scorer for Canada in sevens. Wanderers have also welcomed players from around the globe to play with the club as they travel or on an exchange basis.

Ajax is a dynamic and growing club and not all of the club's success is buried in the past. The club last won the Ontario Senior Men's championship in 1998, a decade which also saw the women's team as the dominant force in the province with a large contingent moving up to play for the women's national team. Although the club suffered two relegations after that provincial championship, the Wanderers won the TRU Men's title in 2004, 2006, and 2009, 2011 as well as the TRU Men's 2nd XV title in 2007. In 2009, the wanderers celebrated their 60th anniversary.

The club is currently experiencing an upswing in its fortunes both for individuals and as an organization. With one of the best facilities in the province, and a continual stream of up and coming players, the club continues to provide players to Ontario and Canada. John Moonlight and Kyle Armstrong are current members of the Men's National Program and several Wanderers have recently represented their country at U17 and U20 level. With the success of the Men's 1st XV, the club has seen itself, in 2011, win promotion back into the Ontario leagues for the first time in a decade.

In 2019, the Wanderers celebrated their 70th anniversary.

Club achievements
1957 - Ontario champions
1967 - Quebec 7's winners
1968 - Windsor 7's winners
1968 - Ontario 7's winners
1974 - Ontario Summer Games Gold Medal
1984 - Ontario Summer Games Gold Medal
1985 - Ontario 7's winners (over 35s)
1987 - Ontario 7's winners (over 35s)
1989 - Ontario 7's winners (over 35s)
1990 - Ontario 7's winners (over 35s)
1994 - TRU Champions
1994 - TRU 3rds Champions
1995 - TRU 3rds Champions
1995 - ORU Women's Champions (undefeated all season)
1996 - ORU Women's Champions (undefeated all season)
1996 - Voted club of the year by Toronto Referees Society
1998 - McCormick Cup Winners
2006 - TRU Men's Champions
2007 - TRU A2 Men's Division Champions
2009 - TRU A1 Men's League Champions
2011 - TRU A1 Men's League Champions
2012 - Marshall Provincial 1st Division Champions
2012 - Marshall Provincial 2nd Division Champions

Ontario Rugby Hall of Fame inductees
2006 - Mitchell, Malcolm 'Mac'
2006 - Kalra (Nee Russell), Helen
2006 - Moss, Ron
2001 - Hugh, James
2000 - Fowler, Arthur

See also
Ontario Rugby Union
Rugby Canada

References

External links
Rugby Canada
Ontario Rugby clubs
Ontario Rugby Standings
SNAP Ajax
Drinkedin
Caledon Citizen

Rugby union teams in Ontario
Ajax, Ontario